Minotauri was a doom metal band from Finland. Alongside Reverend Bizarre and Spiritus Mortis they were one of the most important bands in the Finnish true doom metal movement. The band was formed in 1995 and disbanded in 2007.

Discography

Singles
 "Pain of Life/Violence" (2002) – 7"; Iron Bonehead Productions
 "Devil Woman" (2000) – demo; self-released
 "Minotauri/Reverend Bizarre" (2004) – 7"; Metal Coven
 "Satan In Man/Sex Messiah" (2004) – 7"; I Hate Records

Albums and EPs
 Doom Metal Invasion (2002) – EP; Iron Bonehead Productions
 Funeralive (2002) – live album; self-released
 Minotauri (2004) – album; Black Widow Records
 II (2007) – album; Firebox Records

Band members
 Ari Honkonen - vocals, guitar
 Tommi Pakarinen - bass
 Viljami Kinnunen - drums

External links
  - Official site (not updated since disbanding)
  - Black Widow label

Finnish doom metal musical groups
Musical groups established in 1995
Musical groups disestablished in 2007
Finnish musical trios
Black Widow Records artists